Chronica Hungarorum (Latin: "Chronicle of the Hungarians") is the title of several works treating the early and medieval Hungarian history.

Buda Chronicle
The Buda Chronicle is a medieval chronicle from the Kingdom of Hungary from the 15th century, it was written in Latin. The original title is: Chronica Hungarorum ( "Chronicle of the Hungarians"). The chronicle is partly based on the Chronicon Pictum. It was produced in 1473 in Buda by András Hess and is the first incunabulum ever printed in Hungary.

It relates the history of Hungary from the earliest times to the coronation and victories of King Matthias of Hungary. Eleven copies of the chronicle are known to survive, two of them in Hungary: one in the National Széchényi Library and another in the Budapest University Library.

Thuróczy Chronicle 
The Chronica Hungarorum ( "Chronicle of the Hungarians") was written by Johannes Thuróczy. At the 1480–1490s years, three Hungarian histories were written in the environment of the Hungarian royal court, by Johannes Thuróczy, Pietro Ranzano and Antonio Bonfini. The Thuróczy Chronicle rooted in the tradition of medieval Hungarian chronicles. Johannes Thuróczy accomplished the career of the contemporaneous literates of Law, and in the last years of his life he was the judge of the court of the king’s personal presence. The chronicle was published twice in print in 1488 in Brno and Augsburg. The Augsburg edition had two versions, the description of the Austrian campaign is missing from which one was dedicated to the German audience. Nevertheless, two decorative copies have been preserved which were made for King Matthias of Hungary. Both were printed on parchment and the editor’s preface was made with gilded letters for the first time in history. The engravings of both volumes were painted at the Hungarian royal court.  

The chronicle describes the history of Hungarians from the earliest times to 1487. The chronicle contains hand-colored woodcuts depicting 41 Hungarian kings and leaders. 

The images are listed in the same order as their appearance in the chronicle.

See also 

 Gesta Hungarorum
 Gesta Hunnorum et Hungarorum
 Chronicon Pictum

References

External links 

 
 
 
 

 
Hungarian books
History of Hungary
History of the Hungarians
Kingdom of Hungary
Medieval Kingdom of Hungary
9th century in Hungary
10th century in Hungary
11th century in Hungary
12th century in Hungary
13th century in Hungary
14th century in Hungary
15th century in Hungary
15th-century illuminated manuscripts
15th-century history books
15th-century Latin books
Illuminated histories